Hemulal Yadav is an Indian cricketer who played first-class cricket for Tripura. He is one of just six batsman in the history of first-class cricket to be given out timed out. He was dismissed in this rare fashion on 20 December 1997 in a Ranji Trophy match between Orissa and Tripura at Cuttack.

References

External links
 Article in Cricinfo on this dismissal
 Cricinfo Player Profile
 CricketArchive player profile

Indian cricketers
Tripura cricketers
Year of birth missing (living people)
Living people